Calamosaurus (meaning "reed lizard") was a genus of small theropod dinosaur from the Barremian-age Lower Cretaceous Wessex Formation of the Isle of Wight, England. It is based on two cervical vertebrae (BMNH R901), collected by Reverend William Fox.

History and taxonomy
 
Richard Lydekker came across these bones when cataloguing the Fox collection and named them Calamospondylus foxi, noting their similarity to those of Coelurus. Unfortunately, Calamospondylus had already been coined in 1866 (ironically by Reverend Fox himself, the very man honored in Lydekker's species name). Lydekker renamed it in 1891 to its present title. He also at this time provisionally referred to it the right tibia NHMUK R.186, which was identified by Naish et al. (2001) as belonging to a basal coelurosaurian like a compsognathid, and has recently been referred to Ornithomimosauria by Allain et al. (2014).

Because of its sparse remains, it has received little attention. Often, it has been synonymized with Calamospondylus as part of a long, confusing taxonomic tangle, although there is no comparable material between the two genera. Modern reviews have regarded it as a dubious theropod, although potentially a valid coelurosaurian.

In 2002 Paul Turner found a dorsal vertebra near Grange Chine on the Isle of Wight. An associated partial tibia and metatarsal fragment were subsequently discovered by Oliver Mattsson and referred to Calamosaurus. Another specimen referred to Calamosaurus was collected by local fossil hunter Kai Bailey in 2014. Both specimens are on display at the Dinosaur Expeditions, Conservation and Palaeoart Centre near Brighstone, Isle of Wight.

A neck vertebra of a Calamosaurus was found near Chilton Chine on the Isle of Wight by local fossil hunter Dave Badman. The newly discovered vertebra has gone on display at the Dinosaur Isle Museum in Sandown, Isle of Wight.

Paleobiology
As a possible basal coelurosaur, Calamosaurus would have been a small, agile, bipedal carnivore. Naish et al.

References

Prehistoric coelurosaurs
Barremian life
Early Cretaceous dinosaurs of Europe
Cretaceous England
Fossils of England
Fossil taxa described in 1891
Taxa named by Richard Lydekker